Stokell is a surname. Notable people with the surname include:

Gerald Stokell (1890–1972), New Zealand amateur ichthyologist
John Stokell Dodds (1848–1914), English Australian politician
Paul Stokell (born 1968), Australian racing driver
Rebecca Stokell (born 2000), Irish women's cricketer